James Martin II (1826 – October 29, 1895) was a native of Ireland who served in the U.S. Marine Corps during the mid-19th century. In recognition of his gallantry, he was presented with the Medal of Honor, the United States' highest award for valor, on December 31, 1864.

Formative years
Martin was born in 1826 in Derry in the Kingdom of Ireland. He emigrated sometime before July 1847 when he enrolled for military service in Philadelphia, Pennsylvania. On April 18, 1860, he became a naturalized American citizen by action of the U.S. District Court in Philadelphia.

Military service
 At the age of 21, James Martin enlisted for military service with the United States Marine Corps. After enrolling in Philadelphia, Pennsylvania on July 9, 1847, he was designated as a private and assigned to land duties there prior to transfer to the Marine Barracks in Washington, D.C. (July 14) and Roanoke, Virginia (August 10). Assigned to a Marine Detachment aboard the  beginning on August 30, he remained with that ship until transferred to the Marine barracks in Brooklyn, New York on December 14, 1850. Reassigned to duties at the Philadelphia Naval Barracks on October 30, 1852, he then continued to serve on land in Washington, D.C. and Norfolk, Virginia until assigned to the USS Mississippi on November 22 of that year. Re-enlisting again the next day, he was transferred briefly to the Boston Naval Barracks, and was then stationed on the USS Constellation from June 13 of that year through most of the first year of the American Civil War.

Returned to land duties in August of that year, he re-enlisted again and was promoted to the rank of sergeant on August 26, 1863, and returned to the USS Richmond. Engaged with other Union soldiers and sailors in attacks on Fort St. Philip, Fort Jackson and the Chalmette batteries in Louisiana under the command of Admiral David Farragut from April 16 to 28, 1862, Martin was also present for the resulting surrender of New Orleans to Union forces, as well as the attack on Vicksburg, Mississippi in late June and early July that same year.

Still attached to Farragut's squadron in 1864, which had been engaged in a blockade of Mobile, Alabama since November 1, 1863, and serving as a sergeant stationed aboard the USS Richmond, he performed the actions for which he would later be awarded the U.S. Medal of Honor.

Afterward, he and his Richmond shipmates continued to occupy Mobile Bay.

Post-war military service and later life
Post-war, Martin continued to serve aboard the USS Memphis until reassigned to land duties from February 3 to April 3, 1866. After having achieved the rank of quartermaster sergeant and having completed 31 years, 7 months and 23 days of military service, he was honorably discharged on March 27, 1879. Military records at the time of his pension application in 1881 described him as being 5' 9-1/2" tall with brown hair, grey eyes and a fair complexion, and also noted that he was a native of Ireland who had been a farmer at the time of his enrollment in Philadelphia.

Records from the U.S. Navy Department's Bureau of Medicine and Surgery, which were compiled for Martin's Navy Survivors' Certificate file, documented that Martin sustained multiple service-related injuries and ailments during his naval career, including: rheumatism (first documented in the late 1840s); a subluxation of his left ankle (1858); hip pain and rheumatism (1861); a contusion sustained on April 12, 1862, when his "arm was squeezed in working a gun, whilst at quarters", which resulted in a nine-day admission to a U.S. Navy Hospital that year and was linked by a Navy doctor in 1879 to the atrophy of his bicep (via the notation "the result of an injury to the arm while loading a gun on board the 'Richmond', in April, 1862"); a sprained ankle (1874); a severe fall down the stairs while in the line of duty at a naval barracks (1875); and anemia attributed to his "long and continuous service in the Marine Corps" (1879).

Unmarried, Martin resided at the U.S. Naval Home in Philadelphia during the 1880s and 1890s.

Illness, death and interment

By the time he was in his 60s, Martin had developed cancer. Following his death at the U.S. Naval Home in Philadelphia, Pennsylvania, on October 29, 1895, he was buried in that city's Mount Moriah Cemetery.

Medal of Honor citation
Rank and organization: Sergeant, U.S. Marine Corps. Born: 1826, Derry, Ireland. Accredited to: Pennsylvania. G.O. No: 45, 31 December 1864. Citation:

As captain of a gun on board the USS Richmond during action against rebel forts and gunboats and with the ram Tennessee in Mobile Bay, 5 August 1864. Despite damage to his ship and the loss of several men on board as enemy fire raked her decks, Sgt. Martin fought his gun with skill and courage throughout the furious 2-hour battle which resulted in the surrender of the rebel ram Tennessee and in the damaging and destruction of batteries at Fort Morgan.

See also

 Thomas Cripps
 List of Medal of Honor recipients
 List of American Civil War Medal of Honor recipients: M–P
 Irish Americans in the American Civil War
 Mobile, Alabama in the American Civil War
 New Orleans in the American Civil War
 Pennsylvania in the American Civil War

References

External links
 

1826 births
1918 deaths
19th-century Irish people
Military personnel from Derry (city)
People from County Londonderry
United States Marine Corps Medal of Honor recipients
United States Marines
Union Marines
People of Pennsylvania in the American Civil War
Irish emigrants to the United States (before 1923)
Irish-born Medal of Honor recipients
American Civil War recipients of the Medal of Honor
Burials at Mount Moriah Cemetery (Philadelphia)